Ghatixalus variabilis is a species of frog in the family Rhacophoridae. It is endemic to the Western Ghats of southern India. It has a number of common names, including green tree frog, though it is terrestrial rather than arboreal in its life style.

Description
Males have nuptial spines. The colour is variable, even within a single location. The dorsum has a colour pattern characterized by prominent dark brown blotches.

Tadpoles hatch within the foam and drop to the water after a few days.

Habitat and distribution
Ghatixalus variabilis is only known from the Nilgiri hills (a part of the Western Ghats), Tamil Nadu, India. They are found in evergreen montane forest patches at high altitudes. They are only found very near mountain streams, either on ground or low in the vegetation. When disturbed they escape to the water.

Their habitat is threatened by fragmentation due to agricultural and logging activities as well as rural and/or urban development.

References

External links

variabilis
Endemic fauna of the Western Ghats
Frogs of India
Taxa named by Thomas C. Jerdon
Amphibians described in 1854
Taxonomy articles created by Polbot